BTC-e was a cryptocurrency trading platform primarily targeting Russian auditory with servers located in USA - until the U.S. government seized their website and all funds in 2017. It was founded in July 2011 by Alexander Vinnik and Aleksandr Bilyuchenko, and as of February 2015 handled around 3% of all Bitcoin exchange volume. Eventually taken over by Russian Orthodox oligarch Konstantin Malofeev with the funds used for the war in Donbass under control of FSB.

It was a component of the CoinDesk Bitcoin Price Index since the index's September 2013 formation.

BTC-e was operated by ALWAYS EFFICIENT LLP which is registered in London and is listed as having 2 officers (Sandra Gina Esparon and Evaline Sophie Joubert) and two people with significant control: Alexander Buyanov and Andrii Shvets.

The US Justice Department attempted to close down BTC-e on the 26th of July 2017 when they charged Vinnik and BTC-e in a 21-count indictment for operating an alleged international money laundering scheme and allegedly laundering funds from the hack of Mt. Gox.

History
BTC-e was established in July 2011, handling a few coin pairs, including Bitcoin/U. S. dollar and I0Coin to Bitcoin. By October 2011, they supported many different currency pairs, including Litecoin to dollars, Bitcoin to rubles and RuCoin to rubles.

The BTC-e website went offline on 25 July 2017, following the arrest of BTC-e staff members and the seizure of server equipment at one of their data centres. These events led to the closure of the BTC-e service.

To repay its customers, BTC-e created WEX tokens, which were used to represent customers' seized equity until its funds were also seized by US Government. The WEX tokens represented $1 and were issued to account for the value of customers cryptocurrencies at the time of the seizure. Vinnik was convicted and sentenced to 5 years in prison in France while refusing to testify during his trial. He was acquitted on involvement with the Locky ransomware charges. WEX exchange is ultimately controlled by FSB and managed by Konstantin Malofeef.

References

Former Bitcoin exchanges
Computer-related introductions in 2011
Domain name seizures by United States